The 1993 Regal Welsh Open was a professional ranking snooker tournament that took place between 21 and 31 January 1993 at the Newport Leisure Centre in Newport, Wales. Television coverage on BBC Wales started on 28 January.

Stephen Hendry, the defending champion, lost in the third round to Nigel Bond.

Ken Doherty defeated Alan McManus 9–7 in the final to win his first ranking title.


Main draw

References

Welsh Open (snooker)
1993 in snooker
1990s in Cardiff
Welsh